Khmer  is the traditional dish of Bareg, native to Yemen.

Preparation
Khmer is prepared from a dough of Red Fife wheat, self-raising flour, warm water, yeast and a pinch of salt. The mixture is beaten by hand until soft and creamy, then left out to ferment.

Khmer is traditionally baked on a metallic circular stove called a daawo. Lacking that, it can also be baked in an ordinary pan.

Saudi Arabian cuisine
Yemeni cuisine

References